Restless on the Farm is the seventh solo album by dobro player Jerry Douglas, released in 1998 (see 1998 in music).

Guest musicians include Maura O'Connell, Steve Earle, Béla Fleck, Sam Bush and Tim O'Brien.

Track listing
 "Things in Life" (Don Stover) – 3:04
 "Turkish Taffee" (Jerry Douglas) – 3:53
 "Passing the Bar" (Douglas) – 3:45
 "Don't Take Your Guns to Town" (Johnny Cash) – 5:29
 "A Tribute to Peader O'Donnell" (Dónal Lunny) – 3:13
 "Takarasaka" (Douglas) – 3:49
 "Follow On" (Paul Brady) – 5:19
 "Like It Is" (Erroll Garner) – 3:40
 "The Ride" (Douglas, Fleck) – 2:46
 "TV Doctor" (Johnny Winter) – 5:04
 "For Those Who've Gone Clear" (Douglas) – 4:35

Personnel
Jerry Douglas – dobro
Sam Bush – mandolin
Béla Fleck – banjo
John Cowan – vocals
John Gardner – drums
Maura O'Connell – vocals
Viktor Krauss – bass
Sonny Landreth – dobro, slide guitar
Edgar Meyer – bass
Russ Barenberg – guitar
Bryan Sutton – guitar
Tim O'Brien – vocals
Steve Earle - vocals, guitar
Production notes:
Jerry Douglas – producer
Bradley Hartman – engineer
Bil VornDick – engineer, mixing
Randy LeRoy – mastering
Chris Scherbak – assistant engineer
Senor McGuire – photography
Sue Meyer – design, illustrations

References

1998 albums
Jerry Douglas albums
Sugar Hill Records albums